Antoine Mostaert (Dutch: Antoon; 10 August 1881 – 1971) was a Belgian Roman Catholic missionary in China.

Life 
Born in Bruges; studied Latin and Greek during his Secondary education. He joined the CICM Missionaries, and was ordained priest. As a seminarian in Belgium he studied Chinese, which he came to know well; he also began to learn Mongolian using Isaac Jacob Schmidt’s Grammatik der mongolischen Sprache (St. Petersburg, 1831) and a Mongolian New Testament. He served as a missionary in the town of Boro Balγasu in the southern Ordos region from 1906-1925. His early work concentrated on Ordos Mongolian, with studies of phonology and the compilation of a dictionary. He also translated Catholic works from Chinese into Mongolian. The Monguor language formed another field of study. From 1925-1948 he lived in Beijing, where he devoted himself primarily to scholarship. In 1948 he moved to the United States, where he lived until his retirement to Belgium in 1965. Died in Tienen. His Mongol name was Tiyen Baγsi or Nom-un Baγsi Tiyen, deriving from his Chinese name Tian Qingbo (田清波).

In addition to linguistics he worked on ethnography and folklore. In 1926 he began work on an analysis of the Secret History of the Mongols. Overall, Mostaert seems to have had the most extensive command of Mongol of any twentieth century Western scholar, derived from his decades living among the Ordos Mongols as a pastor. Nicholas Poppe called him “...the most outstanding scholar in the field of Mongolian studies.”  Mostaert was particularly prolific as a consultant aiding other scholars, both Chinese and Western, and his scholarly impact cannot be judged solely from his formal publications. His main disciple was Henry Serruys, who has worked extensively on the history of Mongol-Ming relations.

The private library and papers of A. Mostaert are kept at the Scheut Memorial Library  in Leuven, Belgium.

Major works 
Textes oraux ordos, recueillis et publiés avec introduction, notes morphologiques, commentaries et glossaire (Pei’ping, H. Vetch, 1937)
Dictionnaire ordos (Peking, [Furen?] Catholic University, 1941-4)
Folklore ordos (Peip’ing, Catholic University, 1947)
Sur quelques passages de l’Histoire Secrète des Mongols, published separately in HJAS, 1950-2, in one volume, 1953

He also worked extensively on the 華夷譯語 Huayi yiyu (the "Chinese-Barbarian Dictionary" of the Bureau of Translators), which like the Secret History took the form of a Mongol text both transcribed and translated into Chinese. This work was never published by him, but appeared posthumously in 1977 edited by Igor de Rachewiltz as 
Le matériel Mongol du Houa i i iu de Houng-ou (1389), Bruxelles, Institut belge des hautes études chinoises 1389.

Sources 
“The Reverend Antoine Mostaert, C.I.C.M.”, Serge Elisséeff, HJAS, v. 19, vii-xiv
Essays in Antoine Mostaert (1881–1971): C.I.C.M. Missionary and Scholar, ed. Klaus Sagaster, 1999.

References 

1881 births
1971 deaths
Belgian Roman Catholic missionaries
20th-century Belgian Roman Catholic priests
Mongolists
Clergy from Bruges
Roman Catholic missionaries in China
Belgian expatriates in China
Missionary linguists
Writers from Bruges